Aérodrome d'Hinche is a small airport that serves Hinche in the Centre department of Haiti. It supports only small aircraft and has some domestic flights.

See also
Transport in Haiti
List of airports in Haiti

References

External links
OpenStreetMap - Hinche
U.N. drive through Hinche to the airport YouTube video

Airports in Haiti
Centre (department)